George Bernard Skinner (10 July 1930 – 16 June 2016) was a Canadian former sailor who competed in the 1964 Summer Olympics. Born in Saint John, New Brunswick, he died in Montreal, Quebec.

References

1930 births
2016 deaths
Sportspeople from Saint John, New Brunswick
Olympic sailors of Canada
Canadian male sailors (sport)
Sailors at the 1964 Summer Olympics – 5.5 Metre